Jai Maruthi 800 is a 2016 Indian Kannada action comedy film written and directed by A. Harsha and produced by Jayanna. It stars Sharan, Shruthi Hariharan and Shubha Poonja in the lead roles. The music is composed by Arjun Janya and cinematography by Swamy J. Gowda.

Plot
Jeeva (Sharan) must correct the mistakes understood about    his best friend Raghu by his villagers in childhood after his death.

Then he goes to his friend's village where two village heads are enemies. When he enters he sees Raghu's sister and her boyfriend are just to be killed by the head because he is from another village. He manages to save them by marrying them and separating them in the eyes of the head. He says that he is Jeeva and a fan of the head. He lies to Raghu's mother and two sisters that he is Raghu.

He then goes to another village in the form of a director. There he falls in love with the head's daughter Geeta (Shruti Hariharan), who later reciprocates it after knowing his good character. But the twist in the tale comes when his village's head's sister Smita (Shuba Punja) tells that she loves him. Later Geeta's father learns his mistake. Jeeva violently beats up Smita's brother and gives him a chance to change which he does. The film ends with Raghu's sister's marriage. The pandit asks about Jeeva's marriage which again creates a rift which Jeeva resolves. Jeeva asks the god Maruti which he advices to choose himself.

Cast

 Sharan as Jeeva
 Shruthi Hariharan as Geetha
 Shubha Poonja as Smitha
 Sadhu Kokila
 Arun Sagar
 Kuri Prathap
 Jehangir.M.S. 
 Mico Nagaraj
 Saurav lokesh as Narasimha 
 Madhu Guruswamy as Veerappa
 Pavan kumar
 Mohan Juneja 
 Apoorva 
 Vidya Rao 
 Tanuja 
 Padmaja rao 
 Harini Shrikanth 
 Girija lokesh 
 Ravindranath
 Vijayanand
 Bhajarangi Mohan 
 Vijay Koundinya

Production
Director Harsha, known for his action films like Bhajarangi and Vajrakaya came up with a light hearted comedy script in order to break the stereotype. Actor Sharan was roped in to play the main role while Shruthi Hariharan was selected to play the opposite lead role. Shubha Poonja was cast in the second lead role. The principal photography started in August 2015. The first schedule of the shooting was held at Belgaum. For some of the action scenes, Sharan underwent rigorous workouts and developed six packs. The director revealed that the story starts as a period drama and drifts towards the present time.

Soundtrack

Arjun Janya has composed the film's background score and the soundtrack.

Track listing

References

External links 

2010s Kannada-language films
Films directed by Harsha
Indian action comedy films
2016 action comedy films
2016 comedy films
Films scored by Arjun Janya